The 1st Supreme People's Assembly of Laos was elected by the National Congress of People's Representatives on 2 December 1975. It was replaced by the 2nd Supreme People's Assembly on 1 June 1989.

Meetings

Officers

Presidency

Secretariat

Supreme Advisors

Members

References

Citations

Bibliography
Books:
 
 

1st Supreme People's Assembly of Laos
1975 establishments in Laos
1989 disestablishments in Laos